Davon Morgan (born January 28, 1989) is an American football safety for the Richmond Roughriders of the American Arena League (AAL). He played college football at Virginia Tech.

Professional career
Morgan had only started one full year (23 Overall Starts) for the Hokies and that made NFL Scouts doubt him as an NFL ready player. However, in that one year he put together 5 Interceptions, 82 Total Tackles (53 Solo Tackles), 4 Pass-Breakups, 9 Passes Defended, 1 Fumble Recovery, 1 Forced Fumble, 5 Tackle for Loss, and 1 Blocked Punt.

New York Jets
In May 2011, Morgan signed with the New York Jets as an undrafted free agent. He was later waived September 2, 2011.

Richmond Raiders
On December 23, 2012, Morgan signed with the Richmond Raiders. Despite being one of the standout players on the team, he had to work 2 more jobs just to get by. One of which was a tutoring job with Axiom Educators . He then went on to tryout for a CFL team.

Virginia Tech Pro Day
After realizing he wouldn't make the team, Morgan called up his college Defensive Coordinator, Bud Foster. Morgan asked if he could participate in the 2014 Virginia Tech pro-day. Bud Foster happily said he could. Morgan had a very strong performance at the Pro-Day. Many NFL coaches at the Virginia Tech Pro-Day were very impressed by Morgan's workout. Including Philadelphia Eagles Head Coach Chip Kelly who was in attendance.

Philadelphia Eagles
On May 19, 2014, Morgan signed with the Philadelphia Eagles as free agent. He was released on August 23, 2014.

New Orleans VooDoo
On October 28, 2014, Morgan was assigned to the New Orleans VooDoo. Morgan was placed on reassignment on February 23, 2015.

Richmond Roughriders 
On December 22, 2017, it was announced that Morgan had re-signed with the Richmond Roughriders. He started off the season strong with six solo tackles and one tackle for a loss in a win versus the High County Grizzlies.

References

External links
Virginia Tech Hokies bio

1989 births
Living people
Virginia Tech Hokies football players
New Orleans VooDoo players
Richmond Raiders players
American Arena League players